The Pachora–Jamner  narrow-gauge railway line was opened by Central Province Railway in 1919.

History 
The Pachora–Jamner railway line was constructed by Messrs Shapoorji Godbole and Co. of Bombay. The Pachora–Pahur section was opened up in 1918 and the rest of the sections in 1919. On termination of the contracts with the former Great Indian Peninsula Railway Company, the line was brought under direct state management with effect from 1 July 1925. Total length of the railway was 34.62 miles.

Pachora–Jamner Passenger has a total of 7 halts and 1 Intermediate Stations from Pachora Junction to Jamner and covers a distance of 56 km in 2 hours 5 minutes. Pachora–Jamner Passenger is a train that comes under Bhusawal Railway Division of Indian Railways.

Conversion to broad gauge 

In 2016, Indian Railways announced that the railway would be converted to  broad gauge.

References

2 ft 6 in gauge railways in India
Defunct railway companies of India

Railway lines opened in 1919
Rail transport in Maharashtra
Jalgaon district